Peter Mooney (born August 19, 1983) is a Canadian actor, known for his role as Officer Nick Collins on the police drama series Rookie Blue and for playing Sir Kay on the historical fantasy series Camelot.

Early life
Mooney was born in Winnipeg, Manitoba. He began learning his craft at the Manitoba Theatre for Young People, and is a graduate of the National Theatre School of Canada in Montreal, Quebec (2004).

Career
One of Mooney's first major roles was Dr. Adrian Keeper on Global and ABC Family's Falcon Beach. 2009 saw Mooney star in the Canadian independent thriller Summer's Moon as Tom Hoxey, alongside Twilight actress Ashley Greene. In 2010 Starz picked him to play Kay in their television series Camelot.  His most notable roles are Nick Collins on Rookie Blue and Dr. Jeremy Bishop on Saving Hope.

Charity
In 2013, Mooney participated in the Charity Challenge trek to Machu Picchu, in support of UNICEF Canada.

Personal life
Peter Mooney married Canadian actress Sarah Power in July 2017.

Filmography

References

External links 
 

1983 births
21st-century Canadian male actors
Canadian male film actors
Canadian male television actors
Canadian male voice actors
Male actors from Winnipeg
Canadian people of Irish descent
Living people